Horseshoe Bend is a census-designated place in Parker County, Texas, United States. This was a new CDP for the 2010 census with a population of 789.

Geography
Horseshoe Bend is located approximately 12 miles south of Weatherford in southern Parker County. The community sits in a horseshoe-shaped bend along the Brazos River. It is part of the Dallas–Fort Worth metroplex.

Demographics
At the 2010 United States Census there were 789 people, 343 households, and 202 families residing in the CDP. The racial makeup of the CDP was 93.2% White (86.8% Non-Hispanic White), 1.1% Native American, 0.5% African American, 0.4% Asian, 2.9% from other races, and 1.9% from two or more races. Hispanic or Latino of any race were 9.4% of the population.

Education
The Weatherford Independent School District (WISD) serves students living in Horseshoe Bend. Zoned campuses include Wright Elementary School (grades K-6), Hall Middle School (grades 7-8), Weatherford High School Ninth Grade Center (grade 9), and Weatherford High School  (grades 10-12).

References

Dallas–Fort Worth metroplex
Census-designated places in Texas
Census-designated places in Parker County, Texas